Thalerotricha mylicella is a moth of the family Oecophoridae. It is known from the Australian Capital Territory, New South Wales, Queensland, Tasmania and Victoria.

References

Oecophorinae